This is a list of enforcers who have played in the National Hockey League.

Currently active players
The following are currently active NHL ice hockey enforcers and current minor league enforcers with NHL experience, listed alphabetically by their last name.

Retired players
The following are retired NHL ice hockey enforcers, listed alphabetically by their last name.

References 

National Hockey League players
Violence in ice hockey